Scores: Songs from "Copacabana" and "Harmony" is Barry Manilow's third album with Concord Records. It features selections from two musicals that feature original music by Manilow and lyrics by Bruce Sussman.

The first half of the record features songs from Copacabana: The Musical. "Dancin' Fool", "Sweet Heaven", and "Copacabana", which had been previously recorded and released, were re-recorded. "Who Needs To Dream" is a previously released song which was included on the soundtrack to the television version of Copacabana which starred Barry Manilow. And "This Can’t Be Real" is duet with Olivia Newton-John.

The second half of the album features songs from the musical Harmony based on a true story about the German singing group the Comedian Harmonists. The musical, with music by Manilow and book and lyrics by Sussman,  had its world premier at the La Jolla Playhouse and subsequent productions at the Alliance Theatre in Atlanta and the Ahmanson Theatre in Los Angeles. Its New York premier is scheduled for February 2020 at National Yiddish Theatre Folksbiene.

Track listing

Copacabana
(Music by Barry Manilow, Lyrics by Bruce Sussman and Jack Feldman)
 "Just Arrived" – 3:59
 "Dancin' Fool" – 2:40
 "Who Needs To Dream?" – 3:56
 "Sweet Heaven" – 3:43
 "Bolero de Amor" – 4:31
 "This Can’t Be Real" - (duet with Olivia Newton-John)  – 4:15
 "Copacabana (At The Copa)" 2005 Dance Mix – 5:03

Harmony
(Music by Barry Manilow, Lyrics by Bruce Sussman)
"Harmony" – 4:38
"And What Do You See?" – 3:43
"Every Single Day" – 2:59
"This Is Our Time!" – 3:04
"Where You Go" – 3:35
"In This World" – 4:23
"Stars In The Night" – 4:00

References

Scores (album)
2004 albums
Albums produced by Phil Ramone